The Dark Horse is a 2014 New Zealand drama film written and directed by James Napier Robertson and starring Cliff Curtis and James Rolleston. It won Best Picture, Best Director, Best Screenplay, Best Actor, Best Supporting Actor and Best Score at the 2014 New Zealand Film Awards, Best Film at the 2015 Seattle International Film Festival (SIFF), 2015 San Francisco International Film Festival (SFIFF) and 2015 Rotterdam International Film Festival (IFFR), was New York Times Critics' Pick and Time Magazine Critics' Pick, and was labeled by leading New Zealand critics as "One of the greatest New Zealand films ever made".  It premiered at the 2014 Toronto International Film Festival (TIFF), and was created by production company Four Knights Film. The film was released theatrically in the U.S. by Broad Green Pictures on 1 April 2016.

Plot
The Dark Horse is based on the real-life story of Genesis Potini, a brilliant New Zealand chess player who suffered from severe bipolar disorder. The film begins with him walking down a street in the rain, before walking into an antique store and playing a chess game with himself. He has flashbacks of being taught chess by his older brother, and eventually is taken away by police officers to a hospital because of his mental state. He is released into the care of his brother Ariki, who allows him to sleep in his son's room. Upon hearing about a chess club run by his old chess buddy Noble Keelan, he goes around to his house early in the morning to ask to join.  He is told he can only do so if he promises to not "rock the boat." Genesis meets the Eastern Knights Chess club in a shed where he learns that they only have one chess board, and the kids are not particularly motivated. He introduces himself and discloses that he wants to lead them to the Junior National Championships in Auckland, something Noble is initially frustrated with Genesis about. Mana, Ariki's son, followed him to the club, and it is revealed that he will be patched into his father's Gang, the Vagrants, on his birthday. He is given over to Mutt to harden him up. Ariki, believing that Genesis could interfere with this process asks him to leave. Genesis begins sleeping on the monument on Kaiti Hill, and leading meetings at the Chess club, now held at the marae with new chess sets. Mana, though initially hostile towards Genesis begins to see him more regularly, and joins the chess club. Mana reveals that he has been abused and urinated on by Mutt as part of his gang initiation. He also has a V tattooed on his face.

The mother of one of the members of Eastern Knights finds out that Genesis is homeless, and refuses to let her son participate, sending him into another mental breakdown. Sandy allows him to sleep at a friends house, and they all prepare to go to Auckland for the championship. Mana realizes he cannot come as it is on the day that he will be patched, and leaves angrily. Genesis attempts to reason with Ariki, but he refuses to let Mana leave. On the day they leave for Auckland, Genesis stops at the monument to pick up a distraught Mana, and says that Ariki has allowed him to come. They go to Auckland, and all the members of Eastern Knights lose their games apart from Michael and Mana. That night, Mana reveals that he knows Genesis lied about him having permission to come, but that Mana knows his father is dying. He ends up losing his match the next day, but Michael goes on to compete in the final. Genesis repeatedly calls out during the final, and has to be sent outside, but Michael ends up winning the final. Ariki arrives shortly after, and punches Genesis before he yells at Mana to get in the car. The Eastern Knights travel back to Gisborne, and Genesis is visibly upset. He goes over to his brother's to find his nephew, who is unconscious with a black eye. It is revealed that he has just been patched, and Mutt begins beating Genesis, but is stopped by Ariki. Genesis removes Mana's jacket, and they walk out together, being followed and verbally abused by Mutt. Other members of the Gang begin beating Mutt, and Genesis and Mana leave. The closing montage reveals that the Eastern Knights chess club is still being run, and that Genesis passed away in 2011.

Cast
 Cliff Curtis as Genesis
 James Rolleston as Mana
 Wayne Hapi as Ariki
 Kirk Torrance as Noble
 Miriama McDowell as Sandy
 Baz Te Hira as Mutt
 Xavier Horan as Jedi
 James Napier Robertson as Dave

Real-life basis
The character Curtis plays, Genesis, is inspired by real-life Gisborne speed chess player and coach Genesis Potini, who died in 2011. By teaching local youth to play chess, he hoped to give them a positive focus in life and dissuade them from getting involved in gangs and crime. Potini struggled with bipolar disorder, requiring frequent hospital stays. Potini had been the subject of a well received 2003 documentary film, Dark Horse. At the request of director James Napier Robertson, Curtis gained close to 27 kg  (60 pounds) in weight and stayed in character for the entirety of the shoot to play Genesis. Napier Robertson also had Curtis study chess with some of Potini's erstwhile friends, including FIDE Master Ewen Green.

Release

Box office
The Dark Horse grossed $67,533 in the United States and Canada and $1.8 million in other countries for a worldwide total of $1.9 million, against a production budget of $2.1 million.

Critical reception
On review aggregator Rotten Tomatoes, the film has an approval rating of 97%, based on 62 reviews, with an average rating of 7.5/10. The site's critical consensus reads, "Led by an outstanding performance from Cliff Curtis, The Dark Horse tackles complex themes with a richly layered, unpredictable, and deeply affecting story." On Metacritic, the film holds a rating of 77 out of 100, based on 20 critics, indicating "generally favorable reviews". Upon its premiere as the Opening Night film of the New Zealand International Film Festival on 17 July 2014, The Dark Horse was declared by the RNZ National Review "One of the greatest New Zealand films ever made".  The film went on to become a New Zealand box office hit, grossing $2 million and receiving unanimously strong reviews.  The New Zealand Herald rated it 5 stars, calling it "a great, deeply affecting movie", praising the "brave, assured and layered directing" and the "towering performance of Cliff Curtis". It was released theatrically in Australia on 20 November 2014. The Australian called it "outstanding ... a Kiwi – and largely Maori – work of the highest artistic excellence"; the Sydney Morning Herald praised it as "possibly the best movie to come out of New Zealand since Once Were Warriors in 1994". It premiered internationally at the 2014 Toronto International Film Festival. Variety calling it "exceptional...the most deserving cinematic export to emerge from New Zealand in years", The Hollywood Reporter announcing it "certain to attract awards attention", and Indiewire grading it an 'A', praising it as "moving and incredibly humanistic."

Awards and nominations

References

External links
 
 
  (rating 4/5)

2010s New Zealand films
2014 films
2014 drama films
New Zealand drama films
Films about bipolar disorder
Films about chess
Drama films based on actual events
Films set in New Zealand
Films shot in New Zealand
Broad Green Pictures films
2010s gang films
Biographical films about sportspeople
Cultural depictions of New Zealand men
Cultural depictions of chess players
2010s English-language films
Films directed by James Napier Robertson